Dietrich Meinardus (8 February 1804 – 5 January 1871) was a German sculptor and stone mason of the historicism in Düsseldorf.

Life 

Born in Ovelgönne, Herzogtum Oldenburg the life and work of Meinardus are hardly researched. In 1848, he appeared as the executive sculptor of a monumental Germania statue made of wood, cardboard and canvas, which the Düsseldorf painter Karl Ferdinand Sohn had designed for the "Fest of German Unity" on Düsseldorf's Friedrichsplatz. Together with painters from the Düsseldorf school of painting, he was one of the founders of the Malkasten in the same year.

Meinardus, a member of the city's Protestant community, lived in Düsseldorf's Altstadt, in 1838 in the Ritterstraßeand at 380 Andreasstraße since the 1850s at the latest. respectively 15. At the beginning of the 1830s he opened his workshop for sculpture at  No. 441 and advertised it with several years of study at the Kunstakademie and from certificates issued there. 

The main sculptural work of this cemetery, the high cross architecturally designed by Johannes Kühlwetter, sculpturally executed by Meinardus and equipped with figures by Götting (Christ) and Bayerle (Mary), was erected in 1850. It was relocated to the so-called "Millionenhügel" of the Düsseldorf North Cemetery in 1905 because of the construction of Klever Straße, which has cut through the cemetery at the original site of the high cross since 1903/1904. A significant further work produced in cooperation between Kühlwetter and Meinardus was the 1843 Jesuit Monument, a communal grave with a stele in the form of a Neogothic pinnacle made of sandstone, commemorating the clergy of the Society of Jesus order active in Prussian times at the Andreaskirche.

Meinardus died in 1871 at the age of 66 in Düsseldorf. He was buried in the grave of his wife Luise, née Dallemscheid (1812-1868), in the Golzheim cemetery.

After Meinardus' death, his workshop was continued by his son Alexander Meinardus (23 July 1843 - 23 June 1891). In the third generation, Dietrich Meinardus' grandson Paul took over the workshop and also signed under the name 'Dietrich Meinardus'. The grandson Siegfried (1874-1933) also became a sculptor.

References

Further reading 
 Inge Zacher: Friedhofsanlagen und Grabmäler der kommunalen Friedhöfe. In Eduard Trier, Willy Weyres (ed.): Kunst des 19. Jahrhunderts im Rheinland. Vol. IV: Plastik. Schwann, Düsseldorf 1980, .

19th-century German sculptors
1804 births
1871 deaths
People from Oldenburg (city)